5S is a workplace organization method that uses a list of five Japanese words: , , , , and . These have been translated as 'sort', 'set in order', 'shine', 'standardize', and 'sustain'. The list describes how to organize a work space for efficiency and effectiveness by identifying and storing the items used, maintaining the area and items, and sustaining the new organizational system. The decision-making process usually comes from a dialogue about standardization, which builds understanding among employees of how they should do the work.

In some quarters, 5S has become 6S, the sixth element being safety (safe).

Other than a specific stand-alone methodology, 5S is frequently viewed as an element of a broader construct known as visual control, visual workplace, or visual factory. Under those (and similar) terminologies, Western companies were applying underlying concepts of 5S before publication, in English, of the formal 5S methodology. For example, a workplace-organization photo from Tennant Company (a Minneapolis-based manufacturer) quite similar to the one accompanying this article appeared in a manufacturing-management book in 1986.

6 Big Losses in Lean Manufacturing 
Traditionally among Six Big Losses which are to be minimized they name Equipment Failure, Setup and Adjustments, Idling and Minor Stops, Reduced Speed, Process Defects, as well as Reduced Yield.

Origins 

5S was developed in Japan and was identified as one of the techniques that enabled just-in-time manufacturing.

Two major frameworks for understanding and applying 5S to business environments have arisen, one proposed by Takashi Osada, the other by Hiroyuki Hirano.
Hirano provided a structure to improve programs with a series of identifiable steps, each building on its predecessor.

Before this Japanese management framework, a similar "scientific management" was proposed by Alexey Gastev and the USSR Central Institute of Labour (CIT) in Moscow.

Each S 
There are five 5S phases. They can be translated to English as 'sort', 'set in order', 'shine', 'standardize', and 'sustain'. Other translations are possible.

Sort

 is sorting through all items in a location and removing all unnecessary items from the location.

Goals:
 Reduce time loss looking for an item by reducing the number of unnecessary items.
 Reduce the chance of distraction by unnecessary items.
 Simplify inspection.
 Increase the amount of available, useful space.
 Increase safety by eliminating obstacles.

Implementation:
 Check all items in a location and evaluate whether or not their presence at the location is useful or necessary.
 Remove unnecessary items as soon as possible. Place those that cannot be removed immediately in a 'red tag area' so that they are easy to remove later on.
 Keep the working floor clear of materials except for those that are in use for production.

Set in order

(Sometimes shown as Straighten)

 is putting all necessary items in the optimal place for fulfilling their function in the workplace.

Goal:
 Make the workflow smooth and easy.

Implementation:
 Arrange work stations in such a way that all tooling/equipment is in close proximity, in an easy to reach spot and in a logical order adapted to the work performed. Place components according to their uses, with the frequently used components being nearest to the workplace.
 Arrange all necessary items so that they can be easily selected for use. Make it easy to find and pick up necessary items.
 Assign fixed locations for items. Use clear labels, marks or hints so that items are easy to return to the correct location and so that it is easy to spot missing items.

Shine

 is sweeping or cleaning and inspecting the workplace, tools and machinery on a regular basis.

Goals:
 Improves the production process efficiency and safety, reduces waste, prevents errors and defects.
 Keep the workplace safe and easy to work in.
 Keep the workplace clean and pleasing to work in.
 When in place, anyone not familiar to the environment must be able to detect any problems within  in 5 seconds.

Implementation:
 Clean the workplace and equipment on a daily basis, or at another appropriate (high frequency) cleaning interval.
 Inspect the workplace and equipment while cleaning.

Standardize
 is to standardize the processes used to sort, order and clean the workplace.

Goal:
 Establish procedures and schedules to ensure the repetition of the first three 'S' practices.

Implementation:
 Develop a work structure that will support the new practices and make it part of the daily routine.
 Ensure everyone knows their responsibilities of performing the sorting, organizing and cleaning.
 Use photos and visual controls to help keep everything as it should be.
 Review the status of 5S implementation regularly using audit checklists.

Sustain/self-discipline

 or sustain is the developed processes by self-discipline of the workers. Also translates as "do without being told".

Goal:
 Ensure that the 5S approach is followed.

Implementation:
 Organize training sessions.
 Perform regular audits to ensure that all defined standards are being implemented and followed.
 Implement improvements whenever possible. Worker inputs can be very valuable for identifying improvements.

Variety of applications 
5S methodology has expanded from manufacturing and is now being applied to a wide variety of industries including health care, education, and government. Visual management and 5S can be particularly beneficial in health care because a frantic search for supplies to treat an in-trouble patient (a chronic problem in health care) can have dire consequences.
Although the origins of the 5S methodology are in manufacturing, it can also be applied to knowledge economy work, with information, software, or media in the place of physical product.

In lean product and process development 
The output of engineering and design in a lean enterprise is information, the theory behind using 5S here is "Dirty, cluttered, or damaged surfaces attract the eye, which spends a fraction of a second trying to pull useful information from them every time we glance past. Old equipment hides the new equipment from the eye and forces people to ask which to use".

See also 
Japanese aesthetics
Just-in-time manufacturing
Kaikaku
Kaizen
Kanban
Lean manufacturing
Muda
Gogyo (traditional Japanese philosophy)

References 

Methodology
Japanese business terms
Lean manufacturing
Occupational safety and health